Elizabeth Mongudhi (born 15 June 1970 in Windhoek) is a female retired Namibian athlete competing in the long-distance events.

Athletics career
She represented England in the 3,000 metres event, at the 1994 Commonwealth Games in Victoria, British Columbia, Canada.

She represented Namibia at the 1996 and 2000 Summer Olympics, as well as two World Championships. Her biggest success is the bronze medal in the marathon at the 1998 Commonwealth Games.

Competition record

References

External links
All-Athletics profile

1970 births
Living people
Sportspeople from Windhoek
Namibian female long-distance runners
British female long-distance runners
English female long-distance runners
Namibian female marathon runners
English female marathon runners
British female marathon runners
Olympic athletes of Namibia
Athletes (track and field) at the 1996 Summer Olympics
Athletes (track and field) at the 2000 Summer Olympics
Commonwealth Games competitors for England
Athletes (track and field) at the 1994 Commonwealth Games
Athletes (track and field) at the 1998 Commonwealth Games
Athletes (track and field) at the 2002 Commonwealth Games
Commonwealth Games bronze medallists for Namibia
World Athletics Championships athletes for Namibia
Commonwealth Games medallists in athletics
Athletes (track and field) at the 1999 All-Africa Games
African Games competitors for Namibia
Medallists at the 1998 Commonwealth Games